Stokkemarke Parish is a parish in the Diocese of Lolland-Falster in Lolland Municipality, Denmark. The parish contains the town of Stokkemarke.

References 

Lolland Municipality
Parishes of Denmark